The International Champions Cup (ICC) was an annual club association football exhibition competition. In 2020, it was abolished due to COVID-19 pandemic.

Format
The format has changed in each competition. Subsequent tournaments have had different numbers of teams in the three locations.

In the 2013 iteration, the participants were designated as part an "Eastern" and a "Western" group based on the location of their group stage matches. The groups were not played as a round-robin; rather, the winners of the first-round matches played each other in the second round, and the first-round losers also played each other in the second round. The two teams with two wins from the first two matches advanced to the final. The other three teams of each group were then ranked based on their records in the two matches played, with a game won in regulation time counting for two points and a game won on a deciding penalty shootout (no tied games were permitted) counting for one, with traditional methods of ranking – goal difference, goals scored, etc – determining order in case of two teams having the same points total. After the teams in each group had been ranked, they were paired against their opposite number from the other group, second playing second, third playing third, fourth playing fourth, with the results of these final matches determining a definitive placing for each team, from first place to eighth.

In the 2014 season, this slightly awkward system was done away with, the teams separating into non-geographical groups and playing a round-robin format with one game played against each other team in their group. After each team has played three games, the top-placed team from each group contested a final to determine the overall winner.

Starting with the 2015 season, the tournament was separated into three geographic editions with a winner crowned for each region based on points total. The 2015 and 2016 tournament held editions in North America and Europe, Australia, and China. The Australia and China tournaments were contested as three-team round-robin competitions (Real Madrid participated in both), and the North America and Europe edition featured ten teams (including three US-based MLS teams) which played four matches each. The 2016 season retained the same format and regions, with Melbourne Victory of the A-League joining as the fourth team in the Australia region. In the 2017 iteration, Singapore replaced Australia as one of the three regions.

In 2018, all 18 participating teams contested the tournament as part of a single table, with each team playing three matches and the champion crowned based on points total. Matches were held across 15 venues in the United States, 7 in Europe, and 1 in Singapore.

For the 2019 edition, 12 teams participated in the tournament. Guadalajara took place in this tournament, being the only non-European team participating. Games were played across 17 cities in the United States, Europe, Singapore and China.

Shutdowns and restrictions related to the COVID-19 pandemic caused the cancelation of the 2020, and 2021 editions.

The Women's International Champions Cup has been held since 2018, each featuring four women's clubs.

History
The ICC is owned and operated by Relevent Sports Group, founded by RSE ventures based out of northern New Jersey, a sports venture firm founded in 2012 by billionaire real estate magnate and Miami Dolphins owner Stephen Ross and Matt Higgins, a former executive with the New York Jets and international soccer executive Charlie Stillitano. It replaced the World Football Challenge, which had featured a more even distribution of European- and American-based sides. Daniel Sillman is the chief executive officer of Relevent Sports Group and during his tenure, Relevent Sports Group launched the Women's International Champions Cup Tournament and International Champions Cup Futures Tournament.

During the 2014 tournament, a match between Manchester United and Real Madrid at Michigan Stadium set the all-time record for attendance at a soccer game in the United States with 109,318 spectators. In 2017, Real Madrid and Barcelona played in the second El Clásico held outside of Spain.

In 2018, the ICC Futures tournament began with 24 teams including 8 academies from Europe, 8 MLS Academies, and 8 US based state all-star teams. Bayern Munich topped Chelsea to win the first ICC Futures trophy.

Sponsors
The trophy was created by silversmiths Thomas Lyte in partnership with EPICO Studios.

For the first two years (2013–2014), Guinness signed on to be the title sponsor for the entire tournament which, at that time, was only in North America.

For the 2015 competition, there was no overall sponsor, rather there was a unique Presenting Sponsor for each regional tournament. The North American tournament was presented by Guinness, whereas the Australian tournament was presented by Audi. Heineken became the presenting sponsor of the tournament from 2016 onward. UnionPay became the sponsor of the tournament for the Singapore leg since 2018.

Results by year

Country editions (2013–2017)

Worldwide (since 2018)

Top goalscorers by year

2013

2014

2015

Note: Goals from the Worldwide edition are not included.

Results by clubs

Results by countries

Notes

References

See also
Women's International Champions Cup

External links

 
American soccer friendly trophies
Chinese football friendly trophies
Australian soccer friendly trophies
Association football friendly trophies
2013 establishments in the United States
Recurring sporting events established in 2013